Dodangeh-ye Bozorg (also Romanized as Dodāngeh-ye Bozorg, Do Dāngeh Bozorg, Do Dāngeh-ye Bozorg, and Dow Dāngeh-ye Bozorg) is a village in Dodangeh Rural District, in the Central District of Behbahan County, Khuzestan Province, Iran. At the 2006 census, its population was 1,308, in 274 families.

References 

Populated places in Behbahan County